Mesna Upper Secondary School is one of three public upper secondary schools in Lillehammer, Norway. 

It is located near Stampesletta and was opened on 26 August 1985. During the 2016 Winter Youth Olympics, the school is scheduled to act as the media center.

References

Secondary schools in Norway
Lillehammer
1986 establishments in Norway
Oppland County Municipality
Educational institutions established in 1986